Monte Pizzocolo is a mountain of Lombardy, Italy. It has an elevation of 1,581 metres.

Mountains of the Alps
Mountains of Lombardy
Garda Mountains